Paradictyna is a genus of South Pacific cribellate araneomorph spiders in the family Dictynidae, and was first described by Raymond Robert Forster in 1970.  it contains only two species, both found in New Zealand: P. ilamia and P. rufoflava.

References

External links

Araneomorphae genera
Dictynidae
Spiders of New Zealand
Taxa named by Raymond Robert Forster